= Shalizhi =

Shalizhi (Chinese: 沙裏直) (d. after 1142 C.E) lead a militia during the Jin Dynasty (1115-1234 C.E) to help protect her town against a rebellion.

== Biography ==
Shalizhi was born during the Jin Dynasty (1115-1234 C.E). Both her brother and husband were military commanders. When the rebellion in the Huanglong Superior Prefecture spread to her home in 1122 C.E, Shalizhi gathered 500 of the townspeople and created camps with fenced areas for protection. Shalizhi had everyone use blankets as armor, make banners out of clothing for the men, and had women make loud noises. Shalizhi and her troops stood their ground for 3 days until the 1000 invading rebels retreated. In 1142 C.E, she was presented with the title of Mistress Commander of Jinyuan (金源郡夫人).
